Bosphorus Airways was a Charter Airline from Turkey that operated for a brief period of time from 1992 to 1993.


History
Bosphorus Airways began services in April 1992 with two Boeing 737-3H9 for charter flights to and from Turkey. In May 1993, one of the B737 was temporarily impounded for violations of the flight embargo into Serbia. The company planned for the summer season flights with larger McDonnell Douglas DC-10 to start. However, these ideas were dashed, since utilization and demand due to the effects of the Second Gulf War, declined rapidly. The financial situation for the airline worsened and by the end of 1993 the airline was shut down.

Fleet
2 Boeing 727
2 Boeing 737-300

References

External links
Impounded plane determinations

Defunct airlines of Turkey
Airlines established in 1992
Airlines disestablished in 1993
Defunct charter airlines of Turkey